The 1914 Colby Mules football team represented Colby College during the 1914 college football season. The team has been described as the greatest in Colby history as well as one of the strongest college teams ever in the state of Maine. Colby defeated its three in-state rivals—, Maine, and —by a combined score 123 to 0 to win the series title and gained national recognition for its game against the star–studded Navy Midshipmen. The team was led by first year head coach Myron E. Fuller and captained by senior Paul "Ginger" Fraser.

Schedule
Colby's 1914 schedule was announced on March 31, 1914, by manager Raymond P. Luce.

Season summary

Non-conference schedule
Colby started out the season on September 26 with a 17 to 0 victory against Holy Cross. Captain Ginger Fraser scored both touchdowns, kicked both point after conversions, and suffered a broken shoulder in the game. The following week, Colby defeated , 66 to 0, without Fraser. Tufts won the game 40 to 14 in part by confusing Colby with its passing offense, which was uncommon at that time. However, Colby rebounded the following week with a 6 to 0 victory in a muddy game against Massachusetts in Portland, Maine.

State series
Colby started out its Maine Intercollegiate Athletic Association schedule by defeating a weak  team, 48 to 0. The following week Colby faced the Maine, which had won the conference title the past three seasons. As Maine had defeated both Bowdoin and  already, the winner of this game would win the state championship. Colby scored its first touchdown on a twenty-five yard pass from Ginger Fraser to Edward Cawley. Defensively, Colby's strong line, led by Walter Dacey, was able to stop the Maine offense throughout the game. Dalcey helped set up Colby's second touchdown by recovering a fumble on Colby's 17 yard line. Colby also benefited from poor play by Maine's quarterback, George H. Bernheisel, who was benched in the second half, as well as in injury to the team's fullback. On November 2, the Lewiston Evening Journal ran the headline "Colby's Football Team Was Plainly Superior: Waterville Eleven Showed Itself Saturday to Be No One-Man Aggregation" (referring to claims that the team only had one star player, Ginger Fraser). The article described Colby's play as "brilliantly fierce" and "the most brilliant exposition of football...ever seen in this city". It also lauded Colby as coming "near possessing one of the best football teams in the history of Maine intercollegiate sport, balanced and strong, versed in every department of the game, cunning in every move." Colby finished out its in-state series against Bates. Fraser scored Colby's first two touchdowns before exiting, which allowed Jack "Smacker" Lowney to have one of the best games of his career, as he scored four touchdowns to lead the team to a 61 to 0 victory.

Navy game
Colby's final game of the season was against the Navy. Only 13 of Colby's players made the trip to Annapolis. Lowney scored three minutes into the game to take a 7 to 0 lead. Navy responded with a field goal. In the second quarter, Fraser and Downey scored rushing touchdowns (Downey's was a 75-yard run) and Navy put up a touchdown of their own to give Colby a 21 to 10 lead going into the half. However, Navy was able to put up three unanswered touchdowns to defeat Colby, 31 to 21. Navy was able to make substitutions while Colby was forced to play its team manager and assistant manager due to injuries. After the game, a sportswriter for The New York Times proclaimed it to be "one of the finest exhibitions of football ever seen in Annapolis."

References

Colby
Colby Mules football seasons
Colby Mules football